Lorenzo Paramatti (born 2 January 1995) is an Italian footballer who plays as a defender for Romanian Liga I side FC U Craiova 1948.

Career

Youth career
Son of former SPAL (1986–1995) and Bologna (1995–2000; 2002–03) footballer Michele Paramatti, Lorenzo Paramatti was born in Faenza, in the Emilia-Romagna region; Lorenzo started his career at Emilian club Bologna. On 27 July 2010, he was signed by Internazionale in a definitive deal for €150,000 fee. Paramatti spent four seasons with Internazionale's youth teams until he was sold back to Bologna on 1 July 2014.

Bologna
On 1 July 2014, Paramatti was sold back to Bologna for €1 million fee on a two-year contract, with Saphir Taïder moved to Inter outright from Bologna on the same day, for €2 million fee.

Paramatti spent 2014–15 season with Bologna's under-19 team as an overage player in Campionato Nazionale Primavera.

Siena (loan)
On 16 July 2015 Paramatti was signed by Serie C newcomer Siena in a temporary deal. Paramatti made his professional debut in the first game of 2015–16 Coppa Italia Lega Pro; He was on the bench in the next cup match.

Santarcangelo (loan)
On 13 July 2016 Paramatti was signed by Messina in a temporary deal. On 26 August he was signed by Santarcangelo. He was assigned the number 2 shirt for his new team.

2017–18 season
Paramatti returned from his loan on 1 July 2017. However, on 17 July he was released; Paramatti was not included in Bologna's pre-season camp.

ACS Poli Timișoara
On 4 February 2019 he signed a 6-month contract with Romanian club ACS Poli Timișoara.

Rimini
On 27 December 2019 he joined Serie C club Rimini.

Honours
FC U Craiova
Liga II: 2020–21

References

External links
 

1995 births
Living people
People from Faenza
Footballers from Emilia-Romagna
Italian footballers
Italy youth international footballers
Association football defenders
Bologna F.C. 1909 players
Serie C players
A.C.N. Siena 1904 players
A.C.R. Messina players
Santarcangelo Calcio players
A.S. Gubbio 1910 players
A.S. Pro Piacenza 1919 players
Rimini F.C. 1912 players
Liga I players
Liga II players
ACS Poli Timișoara players
FC U Craiova 1948 players
Italian expatriate footballers
Italian expatriate sportspeople in Romania
Expatriate footballers in Romania
Sportspeople from the Province of Ravenna